Calliotropis stanyi is a species of sea snail, a marine gastropod mollusk in the family Eucyclidae.

Description
The shell size varies between 3.6 mm and 5.4 mm

Distribution
It occurs in the seas off the Philippines.

References

 Poppe G.T., Tagaro S.P. & Dekker H. (2006) The Seguenziidae, Chilodontidae, Trochidae, Calliostomatidae and Solariellidae of the Philippine Islands. Visaya Supplement 2: 1–228
 Vilvens C. (2007) New records and new species of Calliotropis from Indo-Pacific. Novapex 8 (Hors Série 5): 1–72

External links
 

stanyi
Gastropods described in 2006